Sreedhar G. Ponnara, popularly known as Ponnara Sreedhar, (September 1898 - 27 February 1966) was an Indian politician and freedom fighter. He represented Vilappil constituency in 1nd Kerala Legislative Assembly elected in the 1957 Kerala Legislative Assembly election. Sreedhar was a lawyer with B.A., B.L. Before becoming a member of the Kerala Legislature, he was elected unopposed in the Travancore Legislative Assembly in 1948 from Nedumangad constituency and from 1949 to 1956 in the Tirukochi Legislative Assembly.

Life
Ponnara Sreedhar was an active participant in the Indian freedom struggle. He was a participant in many movements including Non- Cooperation Movement of 1922 , Foreign Garment Boycott, Nagpur Satyagraha,  Vaikom Satyagraha and Uppu Satyagraha. He has been jailed several times. Sreedhar was a member of the Travancore State Congress and the KPCC. In 1923, he participated in the Delhi Congress. He is known for forming the Samasta Travancore Youth League in 1933, which was an organization of progressive minds. In 1956 he was elected as the Mayor of Thiruvananthapuram Municipality. Sreedhar died on 27 February 1966 in Thiruvananthapuram.

Legacy
Ponnara Park is named after Ponnara Sreedhar. It is situated near Thambanoor railway station and has a statue of him.

References

1899 births
1966 deaths
Kerala MLAs 1957–1959
Kerala MLAs 1960–1964
Praja Socialist Party politicians